"Waiting for the End" is a 2010 song by Linkin Park.

Waiting for the End may also refer to:

Books
Waiting for the End, book by Leslie A. Fiedler 1964

Music
"Waiting for the End", song by Honor Bright
"Waiting for the End", song by VanVelzen
"Waiting for the End", song by The Call (band) composed by Michael Been
"Waiting for the End", song by PINS (band) composed by PINS
"Waiting for the End", song by Vitamin String Quartet
"Waiting for the End", song by Thomas Troelsen
"Waiting for the End of the World", song by Elvis Costello from My Aim is True